The West Georgia Regional Library System (WGRLS) is a library system serving the public libraries of five counties of Northwest Georgia: Carroll, Douglas, Haralson, Heard, and Paulding.

WGRLS is a member of PINES, a program of the Georgia Public Library Service that covers 53 library systems in 143 counties of Georgia. Any resident in a PINES supported library system has access to over 10.6 million books in the system's circulation. The library is also serviced by GALILEO, a program of the University System of Georgia which stands for "GeorgiA LIbrary LEarning Online". This program offers residents in supported libraries access to over 100 databases indexing thousands of periodicals and scholarly journals. It also boasts over 10,000 journal titles in full text.

History
Edith Foster served as Director of West Georgia Regional Library System from 1944 to 1977. She wrote a history of the library system she founded called Yonder She Comes: A Once Told Li’bry Tale. Copies are available for checkout at many WGRLS libraries.

A briefer history is available on the WGRLS website to see how the library has grown from a single location serving two counties to 19 branches in five counties that span .

Libraries

Library systems in adjacent counties
Sara Hightower Regional Library System, north-northwest in Polk and others
Bartow County Library System, north-northeast in Bartow
Cobb County Public Library System east-northeast in Cobb
Atlanta-Fulton Public Library System east-southeast in Fulton and part of DeKalb
Coweta Public Library System to the southeast
Troup-Harris Regional Library to the south

References

External links
WGRL official site

Education in Paulding County, Georgia
Education in Douglas County, Georgia
Education in Heard County, Georgia
Education in Carroll County, Georgia
Education in Haralson County, Georgia
County library systems in Georgia (U.S. state)
Public libraries in Georgia (U.S. state)